Dughabad (also Romanized as Dūghābād) is a village in and capital of Mahvelat-e Shomali Rural District, Shadmehr District, Mahvelat County, Razavi Khorasan Province, Iran. At the 2006 census, its population was 2,954, in 876 families.

References 

Populated places in Mahvelat County